Young-Holt Unlimited (also known as Young-Holt Trio), were a U.S. soul and jazz instrumental musical ensemble from Chicago, Illinois, United States.

Drummer Isaac "Redd" Holt and bassist Eldee Young, formerly members of Ramsey Lewis' jazz trio, formed a new outfit called the Young-Holt Trio with pianist Don Walker in 1966.  They met with modest success, including the minor hit "Wack-Wack", which charted at number 40 on the Billboard Hot 100.

In 1968, the group renamed itself Young-Holt Unlimited, and replaced Walker with Ken Chaney.  Under their new name, the group scored a number three Hot 100 hit with "Soulful Strut," the backing instrumental track from Barbara Acklin's "Am I the Same Girl." "Soulful Strut" sold a million copies with the gold record awarded by the RIAA in January 1969, less than three months after the track's release.
Follow-up releases failed to match the commercial success of "Soulful Strut", and the group disbanded by 1974, with Young and Holt continuing to play in Chicago small bands.

The band has been sampled over 200 times, most often in the hip hop genre.

Young died of a heart attack on February 12, 2007, in Bangkok, Thailand, at the age of 71.

Albums discography
1966: Wack Wack (Brunswick) 
1967: Feature Spot (as 'Young/Holt') (Cadet) with Ramsey Lewis
1967: On Stage (Brunswick)
1968: The Beat Goes On (Brunswick)
1968: Funky But! (Brunswick)
1968: Soulful Strut (Brunswick) 
1969: Just a Melody (Brunswick)
1970: Mellow Dreamin''' (Cotillion)
1971: Born Again (Cotillion)
1973: Oh Girl (Atlantic)
1973: Young-Holt Unlimited Plays Super Fly (Paula)
1998: Live at the Bohemian Caverns, 1968'' (Brunswick)

References

External links

Huey, Steve. [  Young-Holt Unlimited]. Allmusic, Retrieved September 8, 2007.

American jazz ensembles from Illinois
American soul musical groups
Musical groups from Chicago
Musical groups established in 1966
1966 establishments in Illinois
Brunswick Records artists
Atlantic Records artists
Jazz musicians from Illinois